Nebularia aegra is a species of sea snail, a marine gastropod mollusc in the family Mitridae, the miters or miter snails.

References

aegra
Gastropods described in 1845